Christophe Gadbled (1734 – 11 October 1782) was a mathematics professor at the University of Caen Normandy.

Gadbled was born in Saint-Martin-le-Bouillant. He is known to have been the mentor of Pierre-Simon Laplace. He died in Caen.

Books by Gadbled
 Exposé des quelques unes des vérités rigoureusement démontrées par les géomètres et rejetées par l'auteur du "Compendium de physique", Caen, 1775
 Exercice sur la théorie de la navigation, Caen, 1779

References
 Édouard Frère, Manuel du bibliographe normand, t. II, Rouen, Le Brument, 1860, p. 1
 Annuaire du département de la Manche, p. 307, édition de 1829 (Saint-Lô, imprimerie J. Elie)

1734 births
1782 deaths
Academic staff of the University of Caen Normandy
18th-century French mathematicians